Vyssa is a former municipality in the Evros regional unit, East Macedonia and Thrace, Greece. Since the 2011 local government reform it is part of the municipality Orestiada, of which it is a municipal unit. The municipal unit has an area of 170.179 km2. Population 6,515 (2011). The seat of the municipality was in Nea Vyssa. It is named after a former village  to its north that is now in Turkey. Refugees from that side fled into this area and settled into these villages.

References

 
Populated places in Evros (regional unit)

el:Δήμος Ορεστιάδας#Ενότητα Βύσσας